"Dear Mr. President" is a song by Pink featuring the Indigo Girls, and was recorded for Pink's fourth album, I'm Not Dead. The song is an open letter to the then-President of the United States, George W. Bush. The song criticizes several areas of Bush's administration and terms in office, including the Iraq War, No Child Left Behind Act, opposition to gay marriage and the gay rights movement in general, perceived lack of empathy for poor and middle-class citizens, and Bush's drinking and drug usage in college. Pink felt that it was one of the most important songs she had ever written.

Released as a single in December 2006, "Dear Mr. President" became a hit in continental Europe and Australia. It reached number one in the Flanders region of Belgium for four weeks and in Austria for one week while reaching the top five in Australia, Germany, and Switzerland. It became the third highest-selling single of Austria for 2007 and the eighth highest-selling single of Switzerland the same year.

Critical response
"Dear Mr. President" received mostly positive reviews from music critics. Entertainment Weekly's Chris Williams described the song "with its incongruous folkie social concern and Bush-baiting applause lines." The Los Angeles Times Natalie Nichols said that Pink taps her inner Ani DiFranco on the confrontational "Dear Mr. President". The New York Times Jon Pareles noted that the song is "well meaning", "hectoring" and that it "grow[s] even more sententious". PopMatters praised the single with long overview:  Rolling Stone's Barry Walters praises Pink for "writ[ing] a scathing letter in 'Dear Mr. President and "cooing righteous folk harmonies with Indigo Girls." Sal Cinquemani was mixed, writing that Dear Mr. President', which cleverly uses George W. Bush's own words against him, pales next to Missundaztood's 'My Vietnam.

Formats and track listings
Digital Single
"Dear Mr. President" – 4:33
"Leave Me Alone (I'm Lonely)" – 3:18
"Dear Mr. President" [Live from Wembley Arena] – 4:45
"Leave Me Alone (I'm Lonely)" [Live] – 4:44

UK Collector's Set CD1
"Dear Mr. President" – 4:33
"Dear Mr. President" [Live from Wembley Arena] – 4:45
"Leave Me Alone (I'm Lonely)" [Live] – 4:44
"Dear Mr. President" [Video] – 5:00

UK Collector's Set CD2
"Dear Mr. President" – 4:33
"Leave Me Alone (I'm Lonely)" – 3:18
"Dear Mr. President" [Live] – 4:45
"Live From Wembley Trailer" [Video] – 0:59

Germany Collector's Set CD1
"Dear Mr. President" – 4:33
"Dear Mr. President" [Live from Wembley Arena] – 4:45
"Leave Me Alone (I'm Lonely)" – 3:18
"Live From Wembley Trailer" [Video] – 0:59

Germany Collector's Set CD2
"Dear Mr. President" – 4:33
"Who Knew" [Live From Wembley Arena] – 3:29
"Dear Mr. President" [Live from Wembley Arena] – 4:45

Australian Tour Collector's Set CD1
"Dear Mr. President" – 4:33
"Who Knew" [Live From Wembley Arena] – 3:30
"Dear Mr. President" [Live From Wembley Arena] – 4:45
"On The Road With Pink" [Video] – 10:00

Australian Tour Collector's Set CD2
"Dear Mr. President" – 4:33
"U + Ur Hand" [Live From Wembley Arena] – 4:39
"Dear Mr. President" [Video] – 5:00
"Live From Wembley Trailer" [Video] – 1:00

Remixes
Offer Nissim Club Mix
Offer Nissim Radio Edit

Personnel
Vocals: Pink and Indigo Girls
Backing vocals: Emily Saliers and Amy Ray
Mixed by: Al Clay
Pro Tools: Christopher Rojas
Guitar: Emily Saliers
Production coordinator: Lana Israel

Charts

Weekly charts

Year-end charts

Decade-end charts

Certifications

Release history

See also
List of anti-war songs
Commander in Chief (song)

References

2000s ballads
2006 singles
2006 songs
American country music songs
American soft rock songs
Anti-war songs
Country ballads
Country rock songs
Indigo Girls songs
LaFace Records singles
LGBT-related songs
Number-one singles in Austria
Pink (singer) songs
Pop ballads
Protest songs
Rock ballads
Songs about letters (message)
Songs about George W. Bush
Songs written by Billy Mann
Songs written by Pink (singer)
Ultratop 50 Singles (Flanders) number-one singles